Princess Ingeborg of Denmark (Ingeborg Charlotte Caroline Frederikke Louise; 2 August 1878 – 12 March 1958), was a Princess of Sweden by marriage to Prince Carl, Duke of Västergötland. She was the daughter of Frederick VIII of Denmark, and the maternal grandmother of Harald V of Norway, Baudouin and Albert II of Belgium, the matrilineal great grandmother of Henri, Grand Duke of Luxembourg, the paternal grand-aunt of Margrethe II of Denmark, and the great-grand-aunt by marriage of Carl XVI Gustaf of Sweden.

Early life
Princess Ingeborg was born on 2 August 1878 at her parents' country residence, the Charlottenlund Palace north of Copenhagen, during the reign of her paternal grandfather, King Christian IX. She was the second daughter and fifth child of Crown Prince Frederick of Denmark, and his wife Princess Louise of Sweden. Her father was the eldest son of King Christian IX of Denmark and Louise of Hesse-Kassel, and her mother was the only daughter of King Charles XV of Sweden and Norway and Louise of the Netherlands. She was baptised with the names Ingeborg Charlotte Caroline Frederikke Louise, and was known as Princess Ingeborg.

As a granddaughter of Christian IX, the "Father-in-Law of Europe", she was a first cousin of King George V of the United Kingdom, Tsar Nicholas II of Russia and King Constantine I of Greece. 

Princess Ingeborg was raised with her siblings at the royal household in Copenhagen, and grew up between her parents' city residence, the Frederick VIII's Palace, an 18th-century palace which forms part of the Amalienborg Palace complex in central Copenhagen, and their country residence, the Charlottenlund Palace, located by the coastline of the Øresund strait north of the city. In contrast to the usual practise of the period, where royal children were brought up by governesses, the children were raised by Crown Princess Louise herself.

Marriage

In May 1897, Princess Ingeborg was engaged to Prince Carl of Sweden, Duke of Västergötland. Prince Carl was the third son of King Oscar II of Sweden and Norway and Sophia of Nassau. They were, therefore, first cousins once-removed.

They married on 27 August 1897 in the chapel at Christiansborg Palace in Copenhagen and spent their honeymoon in Germany.

The couple had four children: 
 Princess Margaretha of Sweden, later Princess Axel of Denmark (1899–1977).
 Princess Märtha of Sweden, later Crown Princess of Norway (1901–1954).
 Princess Astrid of Sweden, later Queen of the Belgians (1905–1935).
 Prince Carl Bernadotte, known as Carl Jr., later Prince Bernadotte, a Belgian title (1911–2003).

In 1947, on the occasion of their wedding anniversary, her spouse admitted that their marriage had been completely arranged by their respective fathers, and Ingeborg herself added: "I married a complete stranger!"

Public role
The marriage was popular because she was the granddaughter of the popular king Charles XV of Sweden and IV of Norway, and she was a personal success in Sweden. It was said of her, that of all foreign princesses married into the Swedish royal house, she was perhaps the one best suited to be Queen consort of Sweden, and for the first ten years in Sweden, she almost was: from 1897 until 1907, Queen Sophia seldom attended public events and Crown Princess Victoria spent most of her time abroad for health reasons, Princess Ingeborg was thereby given more public duties, unofficially performing much of the role associated with the queen consort at the Swedish court. She is perceived as having performed her representational duties with a combination of dignity and easygoing friendliness, and as attracting a social circle with her wit.
Her sister-in-law, Crown Princess Victoria, however, did not approve of her informality and once remarked: "One does not enter the chamber of the Crown Princess of Sweden without knocking, even if one is Princess Ingeborg."

Ingeborg was interested in sports, especially ice skating, and at the automobile exhibition of Stockholm in 1903, she and the Crown Prince, Gustav, made a spontaneous demonstration trip in a car from Scania. In 1908, she accompanied her husband's nephew Prince William to his wedding with her paternal first cousin once removed Grand Duchess Maria Pavlovna in Russia.

Family life

She lived a harmonious family life, and the family was known as "The happy family". The children were given a simple upbringing, and expected to learn household tasks: they were, for example, given a real stove in their play cottage, on which they cooked real food. She and Carl lived an informal and intimate family life with their children.

Ingeborg was admired for her handling of the economic difficulties experienced when a bank they invested in crashed in 1922 and they had to sell their home. She was portrayed as a symbol of a wife and mother in many magazines and was for many years the most popular member of the royal house.

In 1905, the Norwegian government discussed making them king and queen of Norway, but Carl declined the offer. Instead, her brother was elected monarch of Norway. Ingeborg's kinship to the Scandinavian dynasties helped bring the three royal houses together again after tension created due to Norway's 1905 secession. Politically, Ingeborg had democratic and liberal sympathies and disliked the conservatives, views she expressed during the governmental crisis in 1918. She detested the conservative Hammarskjöld cabinet and the 1914 policy, criticized the conservative press and viewed the resignation of the Liberal-Social Democratic cabinet of 1918 as a disaster, reportedly commented it with the words: "It must not happen! No no no!" 

During World War II in 1940–45, she demonstrated publicly against Nazi Germany by blocking the window of her house which faced the German embassy in Stockholm.

Princess Ingeborg has the distinction of being the grandmother of three European monarchs: King Harald V of Norway, King Baudouin of Belgium and King Albert II of Belgium; and the great-grandmother of two: Henri, Grand Duke of Luxembourg and King Philippe of Belgium.  She is also grandaunt of Queen Margrethe II of Denmark and great-grandaunt of King Carl XVI Gustaf of Sweden.

Honours

National
 : Knight Grand Cross with Collar of the Order of the Elephant
 : Dame of the Royal Family Decoration of King Christian IX, 1st Class
 : Dame of the Royal Family Decoration of King Frederick VIII, 1st Class
 : Dame of the Royal Family Decoration of King Christian X, 1st Class
 : Dame of the Royal Family Decoration of King Frederick IX, 1st Class
 : Member of the Royal Family Decoration of King Oscar II, 2nd Class

Foreign
  Turkish Imperial Family: Dame Grand Cordon of the Imperial Order of Charity

Ancestry

References

Citations

Bibliography

 
 
 
 
 Ingeborg C C F L, urn:sbl:11950, Svenskt biografiskt lexikon (art av Ragnar Amenius), hämtad 2015-02-27.

Further reading
 Rotbain, Avigail. 

1878 births
1958 deaths
House of Glücksburg (Denmark)
Swedish princesses
Danish princesses
Swedish duchesses
19th-century Lutherans
20th-century Lutherans
Danish Lutherans
People from Copenhagen
Burials at Kungliga begravningsplatsen
Daughters of kings